The United Armenia Party is an Armenian political party in Artsakh.

History
The United Armenia Party was established on 22 December, 2018. In July 2019, party members called on former President of Artsakh Bako  Sahakyan to resign, citing concerns over corruption. The party also voiced concern over growing poverty in Artsakh.

On 23 December 2019, it was announced that party leader Vahan Badasyan would run for the presidency of Artsakh and that he would lead the party in the 2020 Artsakhian general election. Badasyan was nominated unanimously during a party congress.

Ideology
The party's principle ideology is the establishment of a United Armenia. Party leader Badasyan has stated, "The two Armenian states should unite in the near future in a peaceful and smooth way and become one Mighty Homeland - the United Homeland."

Party leader Vahan Badasyan is closely allied with Armenia's prime minister Nikol Pashinyan and believes that Artsakh should closely adhere to Pashinyan's inspiring 'renewal' philosophy which sparked the 2018 Armenian revolution. Badasyan is one of the few political figures in Artsakh who supports Pashinyan's reformist agenda.

Electoral record
Following the 2020 election, the party gained just 1.03% of the votes after the first round of voting, failing to qualify for the second round. Furthermore, the party failed to gain any seats in the National Assembly. Currently, the party acts as an extra-parliamentary force.

See also

List of political parties in Artsakh
Politics of Artsakh

References

External links
 United Armenia Party Facebook page

Political parties in the Republic of Artsakh
Political parties established in 2018